The Women's Heptathlon event at the 2003 Pan American Games took place on Thursday August 7 and Friday August 8, 2003.

Medalists

Records

Results

See also
2003 Hypo-Meeting
2003 World Championships in Athletics – Women's heptathlon
Athletics at the 2004 Summer Olympics – Women's heptathlon

References
Results

Heptathlon
2003
2003 in women's athletics